Jiménez Department is a department of Argentina in Santiago del Estero Province. The capital city of the department is situated in Pozo Hondo.

To the east, it limits with Tucumán Province.

Settlements
Pozo Hondo (seat)
El Bobadal
San Félix

References

Departments of Santiago del Estero Province